François Picard is a dual national Franco-American journalist. He hosts the French current affairs talk show The Debate. On Fridays, he hosts the journalist roundtable discussion show The World This Week.

Early life 
Picard attended the Lycée Français de New York. His first exposure to journalism was as a summer intern at Paris photo news agency Sipa Press in 1984. Picard graduated with honors from Swarthmore College. He studied for two semesters at the Université de Paris-IV Sorbonne.

Career

Early career 
Picard started his career in Hudson Valley local radio, working at WKIP in Poughkeepsie, WRWD and WAMC. He has won multiple awards for local news coverage (including from New York State National Association of Broadcasters, Associated Press and National Association of Broadcasters).

In 1990, he moved back to France where he reported for Radio France International, Marketplace radio, UPI and Eurosport. Assignments included the 1994 D-Day commemorations, the building of EuroDisney (now DisneyLand Paris) and the launch of the Eurostar service between Paris and London. Among the sporting events he covered were two Olympics, the Tour de France and the 1994 Football World Cup.

West Africa bureau chief 
His first African assignments for Radio France International took him to Mali and Somalia before being named at 27 as Abidjan staff bureau chief for RFI.

From 1995 to 1998 he chronicled Ivory Coast's escalating political tension for RFI and Le Monde, as well as civil wars in Liberia and Sierra Leone. From 1995 Ivory Coast's boycotted election of Henri Konan Bédié, the arrival of the mercenaries Executive Outcomes in Sierra Leone to the April 1996 street fighting in Liberia's capital Monrovia and Jerry Rawlings' re-election in Ghana 1996, Picard covered the entire region with several trips to Nigeria including the 1997 funeral in Lagos of Afrobeat legend Fela Kuti. In 1997, he was one of the foreign reporters trapped in a hotel surrounded by RUF rebels in Freetown.

France 24 
After returning to Paris and working for RFI's reporting assignment and business desks, Picard joined Eurosport.

When France 24 was launched on 6 December 2006, Picard was an opening night news presenter for the English-language channel. He covered events such as the 2007 French presidential election, the 2008 financial crisis in Dubai, and in 2010 the Ivory Coast election and subsequent return to civil war.

In 2010, Picard was named host of flagship current affairs program The France 24 Debate. His panels bring together different perspectives on topics of the day such as the 2015 Paris Climate Change Summit, Algeria's pro-democracy movement and the migrant crisis. Interviews have included Nigerian President Muhammadu Buhari who told Picard that he wanted to negotiate with Boko Haram for the release of the 219 kidnapped Chibok schoolgirls. Picard's shows bring together prominent newsmakers and scholars. He has appeared on radio and TV debates as a guest and a moderator.

On Fridays, he hosts the journalists' roundtable The World This Week which was first launched in partnership with the International Herald Tribune and then The Daily Beast with foreign editor Christopher Dickey as regular panellist until his death in July 2020.

References

American people of French descent
21st-century American journalists
20th-century American journalists
American male journalists
Lycée Français de New York alumni
American television news anchors
Year of birth missing (living people)
Living people
French television presenters